Alan Kay (born 2 August 1961) is a Scottish former footballer who played for Partick Thistle and Dumbarton.

References

1961 births
Scottish footballers
Dumbarton F.C. players
Partick Thistle F.C. players
Scottish Football League players
Living people
Footballers from Glasgow
Association football defenders